Folkpartiet (Swedish: People's Party) may refer to:

 Folkpartiet liberalerna (Liberal People's Party), former name of the Swedish Liberals party
 Svenska Folkpartiet i Finland (Swedish People's Party of Finland), a liberal-centrist political party in Finland representing the Swedish-speaking population

See also 
 People's Party